Colin Trevor Pillinger,  (9 May 1943 – 7 May 2014) was an English planetary scientist. He was a founding member of the Planetary and Space Sciences Research Institute at Open University in Milton Keynes, he was also the principal investigator for the British Beagle 2 Mars lander project, and worked on a group of Martian meteorites.

Education and early life
Pillinger was born on 9 May 1943 in Kingswood, South Gloucestershire, just outside Bristol. His father, Alfred, a manual worker for the Gas Board, and his mother, Florence (née Honour), also had a daughter Doreen (the local historian D.P. Lindegaard) 6 years Colin's senior, born 1937. He attended Kingswood Grammar School, and later graduated with a BSc and a PhD in Chemistry from University College of Swansea (now Swansea University). He said of himself, "I was a disaster as a science student".

Career and research
After graduating from university, Pillinger became a senior research associate in the Department of Earth Science at the University of Cambridge, and then a senior research fellow at The Open University (1984–90). He became a professor in interplanetary science at The Open University in 1991.

Pillinger's first job was working for NASA. He was involved in the Apollo space programme and ESA's Rosetta mission, and analysed the lunar samples brought back by Apollo 11.

Between 1996 and 2000, Pillinger was made Gresham Professor of Astronomy at Gresham College, a position once held by Sir Christopher Wren. He said of his appointment as professor of astronomy:

	
Pillinger is credited with inspiring many people to take an interest in space science, particularly in Britain. He was responsible for training and supporting a large number of experts in the field as well as helping to unite the space science and industrial communities in the UK. Pillinger worked as a conference and after-dinner speaker for the JLA agency.

To demonstrate his appetite for sharing his research and promoting the public understanding of science, Pillinger laid claim to the phrase "The only thing that increases in value if you share it is knowledge".

In 2000, a main belt asteroid was named 15614 Pillinger after Colin Pillinger. In 2003, he was appointed a CBE in the Queen's Birthday Honours List for his services to higher education and to science. Pillinger played a role in the Philae lander that was part of the Rosetta mission which successfully made its rendezvous with comet 67P/Churyumov–Gerasimenko in 2014. In particular he was an advocate of the idea of deploying the lander Philae to conduct scientific experiments in situ, and was instrumental in getting the Ptolemy device accepted as part of the science payload.

Beagle 2

Pillinger was the principal investigator for Beagle 2 Mars lander project, part of European Space Agency's (ESA) 2003 Mars Express mission. Initially considered a failure, it has since come to light that the space craft did successfully touch down on the surface of Mars. The UK Space Agency on 16 January 2015 indicated that Beagle 2 had indeed reached the surface of Mars on 25 December 2003, but had failed to deploy fully. Images taken by the HiRISE camera on NASA's Mars Reconnaissance Orbiter (MRO) identified clear evidence for the lander and convincing evidence for key entry and descent components on the surface of Mars within the expected landing area of Isidis Planitia (an impact basin close to the equator).

Recent research into photographs taken of the landing site by a Mars orbiter suggest that as many as three of the four solar panels may have been successfully opened. As the transmitter was underneath the fourth panel, the lander failed to communicate back to Earth.

When the lander was first considered 'lost' a number of possible explanations were given by David Southwood, ESA's director of Science. The commission inquiring into the mission's apparent failure also apportioned blame towards Pillinger's management of the overall project as a contributing factor. In response, in his autobiography, Professor Pillinger highlighted a lack of support from key figures at ESA as a factor.

It was Pillinger's wife who thought of the Beagle 2 name for the project, based on Charles Darwin's ship .

Pillinger enlisted British rock band Blur to write a song to be Beagle 2s call sign back home. It was to be broadcast as soon as Beagle 2 began work on the surface of Mars. He also persuaded the artist Damien Hirst to provide a spot painting to use in calibrating the spacecraft's camera.

In 2014, a science destination for the Mars rover Opportunity on the western rim of Endeavour Crater was named Pillinger Point after Colin Pillinger, in commemoration of his enthusiasm for the Beagle 2 mission.

Pillinger in popular culture
Beagle 2 has been mentioned in Hollywood films Transformers: The Movie and Pillinger's work on asteroid impacts in Jurassic Park. A missing British Mars spacecraft was the subject of the 2005 Doctor Who Christmas Special. Pillinger appeared in Top Gear season 3 episode 7 and won a contest based on the best burnout. Beagle 2 featured in a science fiction story by Stephen Baxter and as one of the subjects in The Backroom Boys by Frances Spufford.
Colin Pillinger was one of the guests talking about the planet Mars for In Our Time, broadcast on BBC Radio 4 on January 11, 2007.

Awards and honours
Chronology of qualifications, career, and awards:

Publications
 Beagle – from Sailing Ship to Mars Spacecraft (2003) 
 Space is a Funny Place (Barnstorm Productions, 2007). .
 My Life on Mars – The Beagle 2 Diaries (2010)

Personal life
Pillinger's widow, Judith, is also a scientist. They met when working in the same laboratory and had two children, a son, Nicolas Joseph and a daughter, Shusanah Jane, who in 2015 became the first solo British woman to complete the Race Across America ultra-endurance cycle race.

After experiencing difficulty with walking for two years, Pillinger was diagnosed with progressive multiple sclerosis in May 2005. He owned a dairy farm, but towards the end of his life his illness prevented him from doing physical work on the farm. Pillinger died two days before his 71st birthday at Addenbrooke's Hospital in Cambridge on 7 May 2014, after having a brain haemorrhage and falling into a coma.

References

1943 births
2014 deaths
People from Kingswood, South Gloucestershire
Alumni of Swansea University
20th-century British astronomers
English chemists
Planetary scientists
Fellows of the Royal Society
Fellows of the Royal Astronomical Society
Fellows of the Royal Geographical Society
Academics of the Open University
Professors of Gresham College
People with multiple sclerosis
Commanders of the Order of the British Empire
People educated at King's Oak Academy
21st-century British astronomers